Jacob Snider (January 1, 1811 – October 25, 1866) was an American wine merchant and inventor. He co-invented and patented a method of converting existing muzzle-loading rifles into breech-loading rifles, notably the Snider-Enfield.

Originally from Montgomery, Georgia, Snider later moved to Philadelphia, but died in poverty in Kilburn, London, England while attempting to recover promised compensation from the British government.
He was survived by his wife Angelina and several sons, and is buried in Kensal Green Cemetery, London.

Snider worked for the Pennsylvania Institute for the Blind, and in 1833, he produced the first raised print book in the United States. His method, which involved carving the letters into a sheet of copper by hand, was soon abandoned.

References

American mechanical engineers
Firearm designers
Burials at Kensal Green Cemetery
1811 births
1866 deaths
People from Chatham County, Georgia